In statistics, in the analysis of two-way randomized block designs where the response variable can take only two possible outcomes (coded as 0 and 1), Cochran's Q test is a non-parametric statistical test to verify whether k treatments have identical effects. It is named after William Gemmell Cochran.  Cochran's Q test should not be confused with Cochran's C test, which is a variance outlier test. Put in simple technical terms, Cochran's Q test requires that there only be a binary response (e.g. success/failure or 1/0) and that there be more than 2 groups of the same size. The test assesses whether the proportion of successes is the same between groups. Often it is used to assess if different observers of the same phenomenon have consistent results (interobserver variability).

Background
Cochran's Q test assumes that there are k > 2 experimental treatments and that the observations are arranged in b blocks; that is,

The "blocks" here might be individual people or other organisms.  For example, if b respondents in a survey had each been asked k Yes/No questions, the Q test could be used to test the null hypothesis that all questions were equally likely to elicit the answer "Yes".

Description
Cochran's Q test is
Null hypothesis (H0): the treatments are equally effective.
Alternative hypothesis (Ha): there is a difference in effectiveness between treatments.

The Cochran's Q test statistic is

where
k is the number of treatments
X• j is the column total for the jth treatment
b is the number of blocks
Xi • is the row total for the ith block
N is the grand total

Critical region
For significance level α, the asymptotic critical region is

where Χ21 − α,k − 1 is the (1 − α)-quantile of the chi-squared distribution with k − 1 degrees of freedom. The null hypothesis is rejected if the test statistic is in the critical region. If the Cochran test rejects the null hypothesis of equally effective treatments, pairwise multiple comparisons can be made by applying Cochran's Q test on the two treatments of interest.

The exact distribution of the T statistic may be computed for small samples. This allows obtaining an exact critical region. A first algorithm had been suggested in 1975 by Patil and a second one has been made available by Fahmy and Bellétoile in 2017.

Assumptions
Cochran's Q test is based on the following assumptions:
If the large sample approximation is used (and not the exact distribution), b is required to be "large".
The blocks were randomly selected from the population of all possible blocks.
The outcomes of the treatments can be coded as binary responses (i.e., a "0" or "1") in a way that is common to all treatments within each block.

Related tests
 The Friedman test or Durbin test can be used when the response is not binary but ordinal or continuous.
 When there are exactly two treatments the Cochran Q test is equivalent to McNemar's test, which is itself equivalent to a two-tailed sign test.

References

Statistical tests
Nonparametric statistics